

See also 
 2011–12 Delaware Fighting Blue Hens men's basketball team
 2011–12 Drexel Dragons men's basketball team
 2011–12 George Mason Patriots men's basketball team
 2011–12 Old Dominion Monarchs basketball team
 2011–12 VCU Rams men's basketball team

References